The American Law Institute (ALI) is a research and advocacy group of judges, lawyers, and legal scholars established in 1923 to promote the clarification and simplification of United States common law and its adaptation to changing social needs. Members of ALI include law professors, practicing attorneys, judges and other professionals in the legal industry. ALI writes documents known as "treatises", which are summaries of state common law (legal principles that come out of state court decisions). Many courts and legislatures look to ALI's treatises as authoritative reference material concerning many legal issues. However, some legal experts and the late Supreme Court Justice Antonin Scalia, along with some conservative commentators, have voiced concern about ALI rewriting the law as they want it to be instead of as it is.

The ALI drafts, approves, and publishes Restatements of the Law, Principles of the Law, model acts, and other proposals for law reform. The ALI is headquartered in Philadelphia, Pennsylvania.

At any time, ALI is engaged in up to 20 projects examining the law. Some current projects have been watched closely by the media, particularly the revision of the Model Penal Code Sexual Assault provisions.

History
The American Law Institute was founded in 1923 on the initiative of William Draper Lewis, Dean of the University of Pennsylvania Law School, following a study by a group of prominent American judges, lawyers, and teachers who sought to address the uncertain and complex nature of early 20th century American law. According to the "Committee on the Establishment of a Permanent Organization for the Improvement of the Law," part of the law's uncertainty stemmed from the lack of agreement on fundamental principles of the common-law system, while the law's complexity was attributed to the numerous variations within different jurisdictions. The committee recommended that a perpetual society be formed to improve the law and the administration of justice in a scholarly and scientific manner.

The organization was incorporated on February 23, 1923, at a meeting called by the committee in the auditorium of Memorial Continental Hall in Washington, D.C. According to ALI's Certificate of Incorporation, its purpose is "to promote the clarification and simplification of the law and its better adaptation to social needs, to secure the better administration of justice, and to encourage and carry on scholarly and scientific legal work".

Publications
The basic approach and format of all American Law Institute publications is similar:

 An expert in the field of law, usually a legal scholar, is designated as Reporter. With the help of assistants, the Reporter does the basic research and prepares material.
 An initial draft is submitted for suggestions and revisions to a small group of Advisers—judges, lawyers, and law teachers—with special knowledge of the subject. In most projects, the draft is also reviewed by a group of ALI members with a particular interest in the topic.
 The revised draft is next submitted for additional analysis and consideration to the ALI Council, a body of some 70 prominent judges, practicing lawyers, and law teachers. The draft can then be referred either to the Reporter and Advisers for further review or to the general ALI membership.
 When approved by the Council, the draft is presented as a Tentative Draft to an Annual Meeting of the entire membership for debate and discussion. The membership may approve the draft, subject to revisions, or refer it back to the Reporter and Advisers. A series of Tentative Drafts is produced in this way over a number of years.
 A Proposed Final Draft consisting of all prior Tentative Drafts as modified by membership action may then be submitted to the Council and the membership. When the project has been approved by both, an official text is published.

The final product thus reflects the review and criticism of experienced members of the bench, bar, and academia. The process may take many years, and it is not unusual for a single Restatement of the law project to take over twenty years to complete.

Restatements of the Law

Restatements are essentially codifications of case law, common law judge-made doctrines that develop gradually over time because of the principle of stare decisis. Although Restatements are not binding authority in and of themselves, they are highly persuasive because they are formulated over several years with extensive input from law professors, practicing attorneys, and judges. They are meant to reflect the consensus of the American legal community as to what the law is (and in some areas, what it should become). All told, the Restatement of the Law is one of the most respected and well-used sources of secondary authority, covering nearly every area of common law.

Restatements are primarily addressed to courts and aim at clear formulations of common law and its statutory elements, and reflect the law as it presently stands or might appropriately be stated by a court. Although Restatements aspire toward the precision of statutory language, they are also intended to reflect the flexibility and capacity for development and growth of the common law. That is why they are phrased in the descriptive terms of a judge announcing the law to be applied in a given case rather than in the mandatory terms of a statute.

ALI recently completed the Fourth Restatement of U.S. Foreign Relations Law and the Principles of Election Administration.

Principles of the law
Beginning with the Principles of Corporate Governance (issued in 1994), the American Law Institute has more recently undertaken intensive studies of areas of law thought to need reform. This type of analysis typically results in a publication that recommends changes in the law. Principles of the Law issued so far include volumes on Aggregate Litigation (2010), Family Dissolution (2002), Intellectual Property (2008), Software Contracts (2010), Transnational Civil Procedure (2006; cosponsored by UNIDROIT), and Transnational Insolvency: Cooperation Among the NAFTA Countries (2003). Work in the Principles of the Law series continues with projects covering Corporate Compliance, Data Privacy, Election Law, and Government Ethics.

Model acts 
ALI has also produces model acts on topics ranging from air flight, criminal procedure, evidence, federal securities law, land development, pre-arraignment procedure, to property. Some of these projects were undertaken jointly with the National Conference of Commissioners on Uniform State Laws (NCCUSL).

The chief joint ALI-NCCUSL project is the Uniform Commercial Code (UCC), which the institute has been developing and revising with the National Conference since the 1940s. First published in 1952, the UCC is one of a number of uniform acts that have been promulgated in conjunction with efforts to harmonize the law of sales and other commercial transactions in all 50 states within the United States. The Uniform Commercial Code is generally viewed as one of the most important developments in American law, having been enacted (with local adaptations) in almost every jurisdiction.

The Model Penal Code (MPC) is another ALI statutory formulation that has been widely accepted throughout the United States. Adopted by the institute membership in 1962 after twelve years of drafting and development, the code's purpose was to stimulate and assist legislatures in making an effort to update and standardize the penal law of the United States. Primary responsibility for criminal law lies with the individual states, and such national efforts work to produce similar laws in different jurisdictions. The standard they used to make a determination of what the penal code should be was one of "contemporary reasoned judgment"—meaning what a reasoned person at the time of the development of the MPC would judge the penal law to do. The chief reporter for this undertaking was Herbert Wechsler, who later became a director of the institute.

ALI recently completed the Sentencing revision, and is still working on the sexual assault and related offenses project that is re-examining Article 213 of the Model Penal Code.

Other work
The American Law Institute has also worked over the years on studies and other proposals dealing with complex litigation, criminal law, enterprise responsibility, federal estate and gift taxation, federal income taxation, federal judicial code revision, and the division of jurisdiction between federal and state courts.

In response to reports of human rights atrocities during World War II, the institute in 1942 appointed a committee of lawyers and political scientists, supposedly representing the principal cultures of the world, to compile a list of agreed-upon individual rights: an international bill of rights. The drafting committee for the Statement of Essential Human Rights included representatives from Britain, Canada, China, France, pre-Nazi Germany, India, Italy, Latin America, Poland, Soviet Russia, Spain, and Syria. The committee reported to the ALI Council in February 1944. Although the project was never presented for a vote by the ALI membership, the Statement of Essential Human Rights was published in 1945 by the Americans United for World Organizations, Inc., independently of the institute. Along with other sources, the Statement was then used to prepare the United Nations' Universal Declaration of Human Rights, which the General Assembly adopted on December 10, 1948.

Membership

Membership in the American Law Institute is limited to 3,000 elected members who are judges, lawyers, and legal scholars from a wide range of practice areas, from all areas of the United States and from many foreign countries. The total membership of more than 4,200 includes ex officio members and life members who, after 25 years as an elected member, are no longer required to pay dues. New members must be proposed by an existing member, who writes a letter of recommendation, and seconded by two others. Proposals are evaluated by a Membership Committee that selects members based on several factors, including professional achievement, personal character, and demonstrated interest in improving the law.

ALI members support the work of the institute, including attending annual meetings and other project conferences, joining members consultative groups for institute projects, and submitting comments on project drafts.

Governance
The institute is governed by its Council, a volunteer board of directors that oversees the management of ALI's business and projects. Having no fewer than 42 and no more than 65 members, the Council consists of lawyers, judges, and academics, and reflects a broad range of specialties and experiences.

Presidents
 George W. Wickersham (1923–1936)
 George Wharton Pepper (1936–1947)
 Harrison Tweed (1947–1961)
 Norris Darrell (1961–1976)
 R. Ammi Cutter (1976–1980)
 Roswell B. Perkins (1980–1993)
 Charles Alan Wright (1993–2000)
 Michael Traynor (2000–2008)
 Roberta Cooper Ramo (2008–2017)
 David F. Levi (2017–present)

Directors
 William Draper Lewis (1923–1947)
 Herbert Funk Goodrich (1947–1962)
 Herbert Wechsler (1963–1984)
 Geoffrey C. Hazard, Jr. (1984–1999)
 Lance Liebman (1999–2014)
 Richard Revesz (2014–present)

See also
Arthur Linton Corbin
SEARCH, The National Consortium for Justice Information and Statistics

References

External links
ALI CLE American Law Institute Continuing Legal Education
"ALI's Proposed Insurance Law Restatement: A Trojan Horse?", Law360, Feb. 9, 2017
American Bar Association
The American Law Institute
The American Law Institute Archives at the University of Pennsylvania Law School
Congressional Record (Senate) from July 29, 2003
"Insurance officials, business defense urge delay in vote of liability insurance Restatement", Legal NewsLine, May 22, 2017
"Legal experts battle over proposal to clarify law covering liability insurance for ALI", Legal NewsLine, March 9, 2017
National Conference of Commissioners on Uniform State Laws
"Proposed Restatement of consumer contract law could give trial bar new weapon", Legal NewsLine, Feb. 23, 2017

Advocacy groups in the United States
Legal organizations based in the United States
Legal education
Legal research institutes
Organizations established in 1923
Organizations based in Philadelphia